Rebbetzin or Rabbanit is the title used for the wife of a rabbi—typically among Orthodox, Haredi, and Hasidic Jews—or for a female Torah scholar or teacher.

Etymology 
The Yiddish word has a trilingual etymology: Hebrew, rebbə ("master"); the Slavic feminine suffix, -itsa; and the Yiddish feminine suffix, -in.

A male or female rabbi may have a male spouse but, as women and openly gay men were prohibited from the rabbinate for most of Jewish history, there has historically been no specific term for the male spouse of a rabbi. In a 2020 piece, Rob Eshman, the national editor of The Forward and the husband of a female rabbi, wrote: "Nobody knew what to call me" because "there wasn't a word for what I was." Some contemporary male spouses of rabbis have chosen to call themselves "rebbetzers."

Community roles 
In many Orthodox communities, rebbetzins have the role of spiritual counselors. In circles such as the Hasidic dynasty of Belz, the girls schools are run by the rebbetzin.

The rabbi's wife plays an important community role, especially in small communities. In many ways, she is called on to be as knowledgeable as the rabbi in the realm of woman's observances: In this manner, for something that does not require a psak (ruling), she can be approached when a woman does not feel comfortable approaching the rabbi, or where the rabbi maybe should not be approached. For instance, the rebbetzin may be consulted in personal questions regarding female sexuality.

When a rabbi is a "pulpit rabbi" (versus a teacher or a "lay rabbi"), his rebbetzin may become something of a "first lady" of the community, performing social tasks and ceremonial roles. 

With the growth of independent leadership roles among Orthodox women, some women have received the title on their own merit, irrespective of their husbands.

See also 
 Women in Judaism
 Women rabbis

References

External links 
 Jewish Action Magazine: Portraits of Rabbinic Women

 
Judaism and women
Jewish culture
Orthodox rabbinic roles and titles